The modern Mexican Legion of Honor (Spanish: Legión de Honor Mexicana) is an order of merit awarded to soldiers, veterans, and others who have made outstanding contributions to the national defense, security, or sovereignty of Mexico.  An earlier, post-revolutionary version was organized as a military reserve force.

Precursor 

A forerunner to the modern Legion was founded in 1917 under President Venustiano Carranza to provide an "honorable location for excess officers of the Constitutional Army." It was available for use as a reserve force in case of national emergency, and also provided training for new recruits.

History 

The modern Mexican Legion of Honor was created in a 1949 decree by President Miguel Alemán Valdés to "honor soldiers during their lifetime" who had contributed to the national defense, or who had contributed in some form to the social achievements enshrined in the Constitution. Eligibility changes included admission for those who had served the country, or completed at least thirty years of active military service.

A 1994 amendment to the original act established some organizational changes, including an official name change to Legión de Honor Militar Mexicana, and added eligibility to those who had "participated in the most preeminent events" of Mexican history, carried out "heroic actions", or in some way contributed to the military defense of the nation, to guaranteeing national security, or to maintain national sovereignty and independence.  It also established a  Council to have the final word on eligibility and defined more exactly the criteria for members of the Navy and the Air Force to be honored.  A 2003 law refers to it as a decoration or award (condecoración).

A 2015 amendment recognized the original, purely military nature of the organization, but taking into account an extended period of peacetime, expanded the eligibility to certain outstanding non-military recipients as well.

Women and the Legion 

Although some women had fought valiantly in the Mexican Revolution, even in dangerous combat conditions, and had achieved military rank up to captain and colonel based on the merits, their grade and achievements were officially annulled almost immediately after the revolution. In 1916, circular #78 by the Secretary of War declared that "all military appointments of women and girls are null and void, whatever their contributions may have been."  This not only blocked their path to reenlist in the army, and the right to belong to the Legion of Honor in their capacity as veterans, but also blocked their military retirement pensions. When peace came, they not only bypassed women for honors and pensions, but ignored their contributions entirely, as their mere presence would do violence to a patriarchal institution.  The 1949 reorganization opened the membership first to civilians, and then to women. Although some women were recognized as members, without recognizing either their military rank or their pensions.

See also 

 Porfirio Díaz
 Mexican Armed Forces

Notes

References

Sources 

 
 
 
 
 

Orders, decorations, and medals of Mexico